is a fictional character and protagonist of Monolith Soft's 2010 role-playing video game Xenoblade Chronicles, part of the Xenoblade Chronicles series of video games. Shulk gained an increase in attention and popularity upon his inclusion in Nintendo's 2014 crossover fighting games Super Smash Bros. for Nintendo 3DS and Wii U. While future Xenoblade entries are not centered around Shulk, Xenoblade Chronicles X features a character creation tool that allows the player to create characters that resemble Shulk, complete with both of his voice actors Adam Howden and Shintaro Asanuma, and he was featured in Xenoblade Chronicles 2's "Challenge Mode" downloadable content (DLC).

Conception and creation
Tetsuya Takahashi, creator of the Xeno series, Xenoblade Chronicles, and Shulk, states that his primary motivation in creating Shulk was to make a more likable and relatable protagonist than in most Japanese role-playing video games. Xenoblade featured a prolonged, four-year development cycle dating back to 2006, where Takahashi states that, while the game went through many changes, the overarching plot following Shulk remained largely the same. Takahashi's personal belief was that the more negative, jaded JRPG character type leads the player to resent them due to the emotional investment required to complete such long games. Takahashi worked with anime writer Yuichiro Takeda on Shulk's creation. Takeda felt that the easiest way to make Shulk likeable would be to make him be a silent protagonist, but Takahashi rejected this idea, feeling that it hurt the character's ability to "resonate with the player". In the end, Takahashi went in the opposite direction, making Shulk's positive interactions and words of encouragement a focus of the game. Takahashi tried to make Shulk react to in-game events as much like he thought game players would react to them. Nintendo's team of debuggers, the "Super Mario Club", assured Takahashi that he was on the right track for his goal.

In English-speaking versions of the game, Shulk is voiced by Adam Howden. He was given instructions on how to portray Shulk, largely that he should have a neutral English accent, intelligent, "not posh", and fierce when necessary. Howden was never given a full script of the game so that he could more realistically sound surprised at the game's plot twists, but he was informed of the story progression shortly before he would have to voice it so he would not sound baffled. Shulk's dialogue was continually revised throughout the sessions to make it more natural sounding, though Howden would still study the Japanese version of the game to capture the same emotions as said version.

Appearances

In Xenoblade Chronicles
Shulk debuted in Xenoblade, released in 2010 for Japan and released under the name Xenoblade Chronicles in 2011 for Europe and in 2012 for North America. Shulk is an 18-year-old "Homs" — the game's fictional equivalent of a human. He is the game's primary protagonist, portrayed as favoring "brains over brawn". He lost his parents 14 years prior to the game during an expedition for the Monado, a powerful sword that only a select few can wield. Shulk lives in Colony 9, one of the two remaining Homs settlements, where he works as an engineer and studies the Monado. The story follows his quest to defend his homeland from the Mechon after they attack Colony 9 and kill his childhood friend and love interest Fiora, during which he becomes the Monado's new wielder. The Monado allows Shulk to see glimpse the near future, which serves as both a plot device and a gameplay mechanic in battles. Much of the game encompasses Shulk's quest to stop the Mechon and avenge Fiora and his struggle to understand his visions and interpret a way to change them for the better, while fending off the invading Mechon and trying to figure out the sword's origin and hidden capabilities. Optional side missions cover smaller quirks in Shulk's personality, such as a distaste for vegetables and fear of caterpillars. In Xenoblade Chronicles: Future Connected, an epilogue campaign added to the Definitive Edition release of the game, Shulk assists his friend Melia in retaking Alcamoth, the capitol city of the birdlike High Entia race.

In other media
Shulk was first publicly revealed at E3 2009 in the first trailer for Monado: Beginning of the World, the working title for Xenoblade Chronicles. In 2013, Monolith Soft and Nintendo announced a spiritual sequel to Xenoblade Chronicles titled Xenoblade Chronicles X. At the end of a 2013 trailer for the game, journalists noted the appearance of a character that looked very similar to Shulk. While he does not play a role in the game, the game's character creation tool allows the player to make their playable avatar resemble Shulk, complete with the option for Adam Howden as a voice actor. In August 2014, a handheld port of Xenoblade Chronicles, titled Xenoblade Chronicles 3D, was announced for Nintendo's New Nintendo 3DS system, with Shulk reprising his role as the main character. Shulk, along with Fiora, appears in the Xenoblade Chronicles 2 "Challenge Mode" downloadable content (DLC), where they are playable as "Blades" — side characters directed during battle. In February 2023, an older Shulk was shown in the Xenoblade Chronicles 3 expansion pack wave 4 announcement in a Nintendo Direct.

Outside of the Xenoblade Chronicles series, Shulk has been featured in Nintendo's crossover fighting game series Super Smash Bros.. Alongside the announcement of Xenoblade Chronicles 3D, Shulk was announced as a playable character in Super Smash Bros. for Nintendo 3DS and Wii U. Howden reprised his role as Shulk's voice actor, altering his tone to make him more appropriate for a fighting game. Shulk reappears in the series' 2018 entry Super Smash Bros. Ultimate.  In November 2014, it was announced that Shulk would receive his own amiibo figure, which can be used in conjunction with Super Smash Bros. for Nintendo 3DS, Wii U and Ultimate, and Xenoblade Chronicles 3D and 3.

Reception

Shulk received mixed reception as the main character of Xenoblade Chronicles. Katharine Byrne of Nintendojo strongly praised the intricate exploration of Shulk wrestling with the philosophical issues of being able to see the future, stating that "players are treated to a delicate and nuanced exploration of Shulk’s difficulty in dealing with these visions... when Shulk quickly learns that he can’t bend the future to his will just because he has the gift of foresight." Phil Kollar of Game Informer stated that, on a surface level, Shulk's character could be seen as "annoying," but that he ultimately became an enjoyable character due to good writing and voice acting. Conversely, some reviewers complained of him being too plain. Destructoid reviewer Jim Sterling complained that Shulk lacked personality, stating that he was little more than a "vanilla reactionar[y] with only vague snatches of individuality," and otherwise blended into the rest of the cast too much. Similarly, Jason Schreier of Kotaku referred to Shulk as a "personality-less, unequivocally bland warrior" who "makes other JRPG heroes look like Marlon friggin' Brando."

In comparison, Shulk received generally positive reception as a playable character in Super Smash Bros. for Nintendo 3DS and Wii U. Heavy.com, TechnoBuffalo and GamesRadar felt that his Monado, particularly the carryover of its "Arts" customization mechanics from Xenoblade Chronicles, made him a strong choice to play as. However, USGamer felt that Shulk "can be a tricky fighter" due to the Monado's Arts being accompanied by kanji, and suggested that non-native speakers should first practice utilizing the Arts in order to become familiar with each one. Jeremy Parish of Polygon ranked 73 fighters from Super Smash Bros. Ultimate "from garbage to glorious", listing Shulk at 61st and criticized it by stating "Sorry, Shulk. It’s nice that Nintendo is letting you rep Xenoblade, but I’m afraid I’m not really feelin’ it.", while Gavin Jasper of Den of Geek ranked Shulk as 56th of Super Smash Bros. Ultimate characters and also criticized it by calling Shulk "as not too shabby, but being overshadowed by the rest of the Smash 4 roster".

Notes

References

External links
Xenoblade Chronicles entry

Deity characters in video games
Fictional gods
Fictional characters with precognition
Fictional energy swordfighters
Fictional swordfighters in video games
Male characters in video games
Nintendo protagonists
Nintendo characters
Orphans in fiction
Role-playing video game characters
Fictional scientists in video games
Teenage characters in video games
Super Smash Bros. fighters
Video game characters introduced in 2010
Video game protagonists
Xenoblade Chronicles